Fassin is a surname. Notable people with the surname include:

Didier Fassin (born 1955), French sociologist and anthropologist
Éric Fassin (born 1959), French sociologist
Nicolas Henri Joseph de Fassin (1728–1811), Flemish painter

See also
Fassia
Fassina